Xiayang Town is an urban town and the seat of Yanling County in Hunan, China.

Cityscape
The town is divided into 22 villages and four communities, the following areas: Dongqu Community, Nanqu Community, Xiqu Community, Beiqu Community, Shanlong Village, Shiziba Village, Yanjia Village, Zhongtuan Village, Chuntang Village, Tanglong Village, Jili Village, Hecangyuan Village, Huangshalong Village, Kanping Village, Caoping Village, Hantian Village, Shiyu Village, Madao Village, Shucai Village, Yancheng Village, Wulipai Village, Shenkeng Village, Shigu Village, Shichao Village, Longfu Village, and Pingxing Village.

References

External links

Divisions of Yanling County
County seats in Hunan